Screenplay may refer to:

 Screenplay, a written plan for a film or television program
 Screenplay (book), the bestselling manual on screenwriting by Syd Field.
 Screen Play (blog), an Australian videogame culture blog
 ScreenPlay, a British TV series (1986–1993)
 Screen pass, a kind of play in North American football
Screenplay film festival, held annually in Lerwick, Shetland